The Kajaani, ; , is a river in the region of Kainuu, Finland.

The river runs from Lake Nuasjärvi to Lake Oulujärvi through the town of Kajaani. From there the waters flow through the Oulujoki river into the Gulf of Bothnia. The river drains a chain of lakes that originates in the municipalities of Kuhmo and Sotkamo in Kainuu.

See also
List of rivers of Finland

External links 

River
Rivers of Finland
Oulujoki basin
Landforms of Kainuu